Apamea verbascoides, the boreal apamea or mullein apamea, is a moth of the family Noctuidae. The species was first described by Achille Guenée in 1852. It is native to North America, where it is found from Saskatchewan to Newfoundland and Labrador and south to North Carolina.

Description
The wingspan is 36–43 mm. Adults are on wing from June to September depending on the location. There is one generation per year.

The larvae probably feed on grasses and sedges.

External links

Apamea (moth)
Moths of North America
Moths described in 1852
Taxa named by Achille Guenée